The Albert Whisinant House is a historic house off Arkansas Highway 16 in rural northern White County, Arkansas.  It is located southeast of Pangburn, on a drive that originally extended from Green Valley Lane in the north to AR 16 in the south, but is now only accessed from the north.  It is a single story vernacular wood-frame structure, with a gabled roof, novelty siding, and a foundation of stone piers.  In a survey of the county's historic buildings, it was the only one of its period (built c. 1920) that had separate entrances into three separate rooms.

The house was listed on the National Register of Historic Places in 1992.

See also
National Register of Historic Places listings in White County, Arkansas

References

Houses on the National Register of Historic Places in Arkansas
Houses completed in 1920
Houses in White County, Arkansas
National Register of Historic Places in White County, Arkansas
1920 establishments in Arkansas